L'Auberson is a village in the municipality of Sainte-Croix in the Swiss canton of Vaud in the Jura Mountains. It lies at the west end of the road over the Col de l'Aiguillon. It is known for its music-box museum, the Musée Baud.

References

Villages in the canton of Vaud